The Port Huron Clippers were an American minor pro ice hockey team in Port Huron, Michigan. They played in the All-American Hockey League in the 1987-88 season. They folded after their first season.

Season-by-season record

External links

 The Internet Hockey Database
All-American Hockey League teams
Ice hockey teams in Michigan
Ice hockey clubs established in 1987
Ice hockey clubs disestablished in 1988
1987 establishments in Michigan
1988 disestablishments in Michigan
Port Huron, Michigan